The 2014–15 OJHL season is the 21st season of the Ontario Junior Hockey League (OJHL) and the fifth since the league existed as two separate bodies in 2009–10. The twenty-two teams of the North, South, East and West Divisions will play 55-game schedules.

The top teams of each division played for the Frank L. Buckland Trophy, the OJHL championship. The winner of the Buckland Cup will compete in the Central Canadian Junior "A" championship, the Dudley Hewitt Cup. If successful against the winners of the Northern Ontario Junior Hockey League and Superior International Junior Hockey League, the champion would then move on to play in the Canadian Junior Hockey League championship, the 2015 Royal Bank Cup.

Changes 
Toronto Lakeshore Patriots shorten their name to Toronto Patriots.

Standings 
Note: GP = Games played; W = Wins; L = Losses; OTL = Overtime losses; SOL = Shootout losses; GF = Goals for; GA = Goals against; PTS = Points; x = clinched playoff berth; y = clinched division title; z = clinched conference title.

Final Standings

Teams listed on the official league website.

Standings listed by Pointstreak on official league website.

2015 Frank L. Buckland Trophy Playoffs

Playoff results are listed by Pointstreak on the official league website.

Dudley Hewitt Cup Championship
Hosted by the Fort Frances Lakers in Fort Frances, Ontario.

Scoring leaders 
Note: GP = Games played; G = Goals; A = Assists; Pts = Points; PIM = Penalty minutes

Leading goaltenders 
Note: GP = Games played; Mins = Minutes played; W = Wins; L = Losses: OTL = Overtime losses; SL = Shootout losses; GA = Goals Allowed; SO = Shutouts; GAA = Goals against average

Award winners
 Top Scorer - 
 Best Defenceman - 
 Most Gentlemanly Player - 
 Most Improved Player - 
 Most Valuable Player - 
 Rookie of the Year - 
 Coach of the Year - 
 Best Goaltender - 
 Humanitarian - 
 Scholastic - 
 Top Prospect - 
 Playoff MVP - 
 Top Executive - 
 Top Trainer - 
 Volunteer of the Year -

Players selected in 2015 NHL Entry Draft
To be decided at the end of the 2014-15 NHL season.

See also 
 2015 Royal Bank Cup
 Dudley Hewitt Cup
 List of OJHL seasons
 Northern Ontario Junior Hockey League
 Superior International Junior Hockey League
 Greater Ontario Junior Hockey League
 2014 in ice hockey
 2015 in ice hockey

References

External links 
 Official website of the Ontario Junior Hockey League
 Official website of the Canadian Junior Hockey League

Ontario Junior Hockey League seasons
OJHL